Hungary competed at the 2013 World Aquatics Championships in Barcelona, Spain between 19 July to 4 August 2013.

Medalists

Diving

Men

Women

Open water swimming

Swimming

Hungarian swimmers earned qualifying standards in the following events (up to a maximum of 2 swimmers in each event at the A-standard entry time, and 1 at the B-standard):

Men

Women

Water polo

Men's tournament

Team roster
Hungary men's water polo team squad:

Attila Decker
Viktor Nagy
Bence Bátori
Krisztián Bedő
Ádám Decker
Miklós Gór-Nagy
Balázs Hárai
Norbert Hosnyánszky
Norbert Madaras
Márton Szivós
Dániel Varga
Dénes Varga
Márton Vámos
Coach: Tibor Benedek

Group play

Round of 16

Quarterfinal
  
Semifinal

Final

Women's tournament

Team roster
Hungary women's water polo team:

Flóra Bolonyai
Orsolya Kasó
Dóra Antal
Barbara Bujka
Krisztina Garda
Anna Illés
Rita Keszthelyi
Dóra Kisteleki
Katalin Menczinger
Ibolya Kitti Miskolczi
Gabriella Szűcs
Orsolya Takács
Ildikó Tóth
Coach: András Merész

Group play

Round of 16

Quarterfinal

Semifinal

Third place game

References

Sources

External links
Official website

Nations at the 2013 World Aquatics Championships
World Aquatics Championships
Hungary at the World Aquatics Championships